The term CAD system can refer to 

 Computer-aided design (CAD)
 Computer-aided diagnosis system
 Computer-assisted dispatch

Specific CAD systems:
 ARRIS CAD
 Caddie (CAD system)
 Data Design System
 Drawing Express
 GenerativeComponents
 Power systems CAD
 Render Plus Software